Kokkinakis, feminine form Kokkinaki (Κοκκινάκη), is a Greek surname. It can refer to:

 Eirini Kokkinaki (born 1996), Greek volleyball player
Konstantin Kokkinaki (1910–1990), Soviet test pilot
 Konstantinos Kokkinakis (born 1975), Greek water polo player
 Menelaos Kokkinakis (born 1993), Greek volleyball player
 Thanasi Kokkinakis (born 1996), Australian tennis player
 Vladimir Kokkinaki (1904–1985), Soviet test pilot, brother of Konstantin 

Greek-language surnames
Surnames